Jean Rodolphe Ryff (12 January 1870 - 10 September 1944) was a Swiss football manager and Club Director who worked in Sport Club Internacional.

Honours

Club
Internacional
Campeonato Gaúcho: 1934

1870 births
1944 deaths
Expatriate football managers in Brazil
Sport Club Internacional managers
Swiss football managers